Marcos Wittke (8 October 1896 – 6 March 1945) was a Chilean footballer. He played in five matches for the Chile national football team in 1916. He was also part of Chile's squad for the 1916 South American Championship.

References

External links
 
 

1896 births
1945 deaths
Chilean footballers
Chile international footballers
Association football defenders
Magallanes footballers